Letters from Hawaii is a collection of 25 letters that Mark Twain wrote from Hawaii in 1866 as a special correspondent for the Sacramento Union newspaper. The 25 letters, written during Twain's four-month visit, were not published as a book until 1947.

During his four-month and a day stay in the Hawaiian Islands, then called the Sandwich Islands, Twain visited the islands of Oahu, Maui, and Hawaii.

Oahu
Mark Twain arrives in Oahu under the reign of Kamehameha IV and wrote Letters 1-17. He climbed Diamond Head, visited the newly formed Kingdom of Hawaii legislature, etc.

Maui
Mark Twain visited Haleakala, Maui, but left no letter on his itinerary of his Maui visit, except some statistics of sugar production in Maui (Letter 23).

Hawaii
In Letters 18 to 25, Mark Twain writes about his visits to Kailua Kona, Kealakekua Bay, and Kilauea.

References

External links

 Mark Twain Letters from Hawaii Study Guide  
 The text of Letters from Hawaii

Books by Mark Twain
American travel books
Hawaiian Kingdom
1947 non-fiction books
Books about Hawaii
Collections of letters
Books published posthumously